Chacobos Airport  was a rural airstrip near Parapeti, Santa Cruz, Bolivia.

Published Bing, HERE, OpenStreetMap, and Google aerial images show the runway is overgrown with trees and brush.

See also

Transport in Bolivia
List of airports in Bolivia

References 

Defunct airports
Airports in Santa Cruz Department (Bolivia)